Ben Trbojevic (born 1 August 2001), also nicknamed "Burbo", is an Australian professional rugby league footballer who plays as a  or  forward for the Manly-Warringah Sea Eagles in the NRL.

Background

He is the younger brother of fellow Sea Eagles Jake Trbojevic and Tom Trbojevic. He is of Serbian descent.

Playing career

2021 
In round 12 of the 2021 NRL season, Trbojevic made his debut for Manly-Warringah against Newcastle.

2022 
In Round 9 of the 2022 NRL season, Trbojevic scored two tries, a try assist, two line breaks and a line break assist in Manly's win over the Wests Tigers.

References

External links
Manly Sea Eagles profile

2001 births
Australian people of Serbian descent
Australian rugby league players
Living people
Manly Warringah Sea Eagles players
Rugby league centres
Rugby league second-rows
Rugby league players from Sydney